NMT (Nordic Mobile Telephony) is an automatic cellular phone system specified by Nordic telecommunications administrations (PTTs) and opened for service on 1 October 1981. NMT is based on analogue technology (first generation or 1G) and two variants exist: NMT-450 and NMT-900. The numbers indicate the frequency bands used. NMT-900 was introduced in 1986 and carries more channels than the older NMT-450 network.

The NMT specifications were free and open, allowing many companies to produce NMT hardware and pushing prices down. The success of NMT was important to Nokia (then Mobira) and Ericsson. First Danish implementers were Storno (then owned by General Electric, later taken over by Motorola) and AP (later taken over by Philips). Initial NMT phones were designed to mount in the trunk of a car, with a keyboard/display unit at the driver's seat. "Portable" versions existed, though they were still bulky, and with battery life a big problem.

History 
NMT stands for Nordisk MobilTelefoni or Nordiska MobilTelefoni-gruppen.

The NMT network was opened in Sweden and Norway in 1981, and in Denmark and Finland in 1982. It was a response to the increasing congestion and heavy requirements of the manual mobile phone networks: ARP (150 MHz) in Finland, MTD (450 MHz) in Sweden and Denmark, and OLT in Norway. Iceland joined in 1986. However, Ericsson introduced the first commercial service in Saudi Arabia on 1 September 1981 to 1,200 users, as a pilot test project, one month before they did the same in Sweden. By 1985 the network had grown to 110,000 subscribers in Scandinavia and Finland, 63,300 in Norway alone, which made it the world's largest mobile network at the time.

The NMT network has mainly been used in the Nordic countries, Baltic countries, Switzerland, France, Netherlands, Hungary, Poland, Bulgaria, Romania, Czech Republic, Slovakia, Slovenia, Serbia, Turkey, Croatia, Bosnia, Russia, Ukraine and in Asia. The introduction of digital mobile networks such as GSM has reduced the popularity of NMT and the Nordic countries have suspended their NMT networks. In Estonia the NMT network was shut down in December 2000. In Finland TeliaSonera's NMT network was suspended on 31 December 2002. Norway's last NMT network was suspended on 31 December 2004. Sweden's TeliaSonera NMT network was suspended on 31 December 2007. The NMT network (450 MHz) however has one big advantage over GSM which is the range; this advantage is valuable in big but sparsely populated countries such as Iceland. In Iceland, the GSM network reaches 98% of the country's population but only a small proportion of its land area. The NMT system however reaches most of the country and a lot of the surrounding waters, thus the network was popular with fishermen and those traveling in the vast empty mainland. In Iceland the NMT service was stopped on 1 September 2010, when Síminn closed down its NMT network.

In Denmark, Norway and Sweden the NMT-450 frequencies have been auctioned off to Swedish Nordisk Mobiltelefon which later became Ice.net and renamed to Net 1 that built a digital network using CDMA 450. During 2015, the network has been migrated to 4G.

France also developed an NMT network in 1988 (in parallel with Radiocom 2000) but with slight variations. As a result, it could not roam with other NMT networks around the world.

In Russia Uralwestcom shut down their NMT network on 1 September 2006 and Sibirtelecom on 10 January 2008. Skylink, subsidiary company of Tele2 Russia operates NMT-450 network as of 2016 in Arkhangelsk Oblast and Perm Krai. These networks are used in sparsely populated areas with long distance. License for the provision of services was valid until 2021.

Technology 
The cell sizes in an NMT network range from 2 km to 30 km. With smaller ranges the network can service more simultaneous callers; for example in a city the range can be kept short for better service. NMT used full duplex transmission, allowing for simultaneous receiving and transmission of voice. Car phone versions of NMT used transmission power of up to 15 watt (NMT-450) and 6 watt (NMT-900), handsets up to 1 watt. NMT had automatic switching (dialing) and handover of the call built into the standard from the beginning, which was not the case with most preceding car phone services, such as the Finnish ARP. Additionally, the NMT standard specified billing as well as national and international roaming.

Signaling 
NMT voice channel is transmitted with FM (Frequency Modulation) and NMT signaling transfer speeds vary between 600 and 1,200 bits per second, using FFSK (Fast Frequency Shift Keying) modulation. Signaling between the base station and the mobile station was implemented using the same RF channel that was used for audio, and using the 1,200 bit/s FFSK modem. This caused the periodic short noise bursts, e.g. during handover, that were uniquely characteristic to NMT sound.

Security 
In the original NMT specification the voice traffic was not encrypted; it was possible to listen to calls using e.g. a scanner or a cable ready TV. As a result, some scanners have had the NMT bands blocked so they could not be accessed. Later versions of the NMT specifications defined optional analog scrambling which was based on two-band audio frequency inversion. If both the base station and the mobile station supported scrambling, they could agree upon using it when initiating a phone call. Also, if two users had mobile (phone) stations supporting scrambling, they could turn it on during conversation even if the base stations didn't support it. In this case, audio would be scrambled all the way between the 2 mobile stations. While the scrambling method was not at all as strong as encryption of current digital phones, such as GSM or CDMA, it did prevent casual listening with scanners. Scrambling is defined in NMT Doc 450-1: System Description (1999-03-23) and NMT Doc 450-3 and 900-3: Technical Specification for the Mobile Station (1995-10-04)'s Annex 26 v.1.1: Mobile Station with Speech Scrambling – Split Inversion Method (Optional) (1998-01-27).

Data transfer 
NMT also supported a simple but robust integrated data transfer mode called DMS (Data and Messaging Service) or NMT-Text, which used the network's signaling channel for data transfer. Using DMS, text messaging was also possible between two NMT handsets before SMS service started in GSM, but this feature was never commercially available except in Russian, Polish and Bulgarian NMT networks. Another data transfer method was called NMT Mobidigi with transfer speeds of 380 bits per second. It required external equipment.

Commercial deployments

References 

First generation mobile telecommunications
Products introduced in 1981
Mobile radio telephone systems